Galtung is a surname. Notable people with the surname include:

 Galtung (noble family)
 Johan Galtung (born 1930), Norwegian sociologist and mathematician